Forever and Always may refer to:

Books
Forever and Always, a romantic novel by Jude Deveraux 2003
Forever and Always, a novel by Cathy Kelly
Forever and Always, a children's book by Debi Gliori and Alan Durant 
Forever and Always, a novel by Betty Neels

Film and TV
Forever and Always, a 1978 film directed by George Kuchar
Forever and Always (Evig Og Altid) film at 2008 CON-CAN Movie Festival

Music

Albums
Forever and Always, a 1992 album by Patsy Cline
Forever and Always, a 1994 album by Priscilla Herdman
Forever and Always, a 1998 album by Parachute Band
Forever and Always, a 2006 album by Silk
Forever and Always, Diana, a 2013 album by The Tridels
Forever and Always, a concert DVD by Luther Vandross

Songs
 "Forever & Always", a 2008 song by Taylor Swift
 "Forever and Always", by Poison Idea from the album Blank Blackout Vacant, 1992
 "Forever and Always", by Gabriel Yared from the soundtrack album for The Next Best Thing, 2000
 "Forever and Always", by Bullet for My Valentine from the album Scream Aim Fire, 2008
 "Forever and Always", by Parachute from the album The Way It Was, 2011
 "Forever and Always", by Peter Cincotti from the album Metropolis, 2012
 "Forever (and Always)", a 1952 song by Lefty Frizzell

See also 
"Forever and for Always", a song by Shania Twain
Always and Forever (disambiguation)